Goran Paskaljević (22 April 1947 – 25 September 2020) was a Serbian and former Yugoslav film director.

Biography
Born in Belgrade, he was raised by his grandparents in Niš in southern Serbia, following the divorce of his parents. Fourteen years later he returned to Belgrade where he worked with his stepfather at the Yugoslav Film Archive.

Paskaljević belonged to a group of several Yugoslav filmmakers who studied abroad and graduated from the prestigious Film and TV School of the Academy of Performing Arts in Prague (FAMU). After returning to Yugoslavia, he made some 30 documentaries and 16 feature films which were screened at many international film festivals (such as Cannes, Berlin, Venice, Toronto and San Sebastian) and met with critical acclaim. The rise of nationalism during the breakup of Yugoslavia forced him to leave his country in 1992.

In 1998 he returned to Yugoslavia to make Cabaret Balkan, which won the FIPRESCI prize at the Venice Film Festival and at the European Film Awards. In 2001, Variety International Film Guide marked him as one of the world's top five directors of the year. The Museum of Modern Art in New York (MoMA) presented a full retrospective of his work in January 2008. 
It was BFI Southbank's (London) turn to organize in July 2010 a full retrospective of his 16 feature films, along with the publication of a monograph (in English) about his work. 

Paskaljević lived between Belgrade and Paris, France and he held both Serbian and French citizenship. As of 2008 he was named Officer of the French Ordre des Arts et des Lettres.

He died on 25 September 2020 in Paris.

Filmography

See also 
 The Prague film school

References

External links

New York Times Profile, Jan. 9, 2008

1947 births
2020 deaths
Film people from Belgrade
People from Niš
Serbian film directors
Yugoslav film directors
European Film Awards winners (people)
Golden Arena for Best Director winners
Academy of Performing Arts in Prague alumni